Oslofjord (formerly Bergensfjord)  is a Norwegian registered ro-ro passenger ferry owned and operated by Norwegian ferry operator Fjord Line. The vessel operates between Sandefjord in Norway to Strömstad in Sweden.

Oslofjord is the last of three similar vessels built by Fosen Mekaniske Verksteder in the early 1990s. The other two vessels are Leif Ericson and Patria Seaways.

Oslofjord was ordered to be renovated at STX Finland for about 30 Million Euros. She will operate between Sandefjord and Strömstad starting June 2014.

On 25 March 2021, MS Oslofjord was transferred from the Danish Ship Register (DIS) to the Norwegian Ship Register (NOR). The reason is that about 90% of the guests on MS Oslofjord are Norwegians. The re-flagging means, among other things, that it will be easier to use Norwegian and local labor on board. The new home port for MS Oslofjord is now Sandefjord.

References

Ships built in Rissa, Norway
1993 ships